The 2002 Southern Conference men's basketball tournament took place from February 28–March 3, 2002 at the North Charleston Coliseum in North Charleston, South Carolina. The Davidson Wildcats, led by head coach Bob McKillop defeated the Furman Paladins in the championship game to win their seventh title in school history and receive the automatic berth to the 2002 NCAA tournament.

Format
All twelve teams were eligible for the tournament. The tournament used a preset bracket consisting of four rounds, the first of which featured four games, with the winners moving on to the quarterfinal round. The top two finishers in each division received first round byes.

Bracket

* Overtime game

See also
List of Southern Conference men's basketball champions

References

Tournament
Southern Conference men's basketball tournament
Southern Conference men's basketball tournament
Southern Conference men's basketball tournament
Southern Conference men's basketball tournament